The canton of Parthenay is a canton located in the arrondissement of Parthenay, in the département of Deux-Sèvres, in the Nouvelle-Aquitaine région of France. The canton is made up of 11 undivided communes.

Communes
The communes of the canton of Parthenay, and their INSEE codes, are:
 Adilly (79002)
 Amailloux (79008)
 La Chapelle-Bertrand (79071)
 Châtillon-sur-Thouet (79080)
 Fénery (79118)
 Lageon (79145)
 Parthenay (79202; chef-lieu of the canton)
 Pompaire (79213)
 Saint-Germain-de-Longue-Chaume (79255)
 Le Tallud (79322)
 Viennay (79347)

References

Cantons of Deux-Sèvres